The Hotzenwald Trail is a two-day, 46-kilometre-long hiking trail through the Southern Black Forest in Germany that runs from Schopfheim to Waldshut. The term Hotzenwald for the region through which the trail passes is derived from Joseph Victor von Scheffel's novel Der Trompeter von Säckingen ("The Trumpeter of Säckingen"). The hiking trail is sponsored and managed by the Black Forest Club. Its waymark is a white and black diamond on a yellow background.

Short description 
The Hotzenwald Trail runs from Schopfheim in the Wiese valley over the Dinkelberg and through the Wehra valley, past the Wehra Reservoir to Herrischried. On the second day the walk goes from there through the Murg and Alb valleys to Waldshut. On the mountains and hills between the valleys there are extensive views of the High Rhine, the Swiss Jura and the Alps to the south as well as the mountains of the High Black Forest to the north.

Day tours/stages

First stage: Schopfheim – Herrischried 
 Distance: 23 kilometres
 Journey time: c. 6 hours

Second stage: Herrischried – Waldshut 
 Distance: 23 kilometres
 Journey time: c. 6 hours

External links 
 Black Forest hiking service: web facility of the Black Forest Club for visualising the Black Forest trails on Google Maps with various overlays (trail network, waymarks, accommodation, ...)

Hiking trails in Baden-Württemberg
Hotzenwald